Angelo, tyran de Padoue is a 1928 opera by Alfred Bruneau to a libretto by Charles Méré based on the 1835 play Angelo, Tyrant of Padua by Victor Hugo.

References

Operas
1928 operas
French-language operas
Operas by Alfred Bruneau
Operas set in Italy
Operas based on works by Victor Hugo
Operas based on plays